The Canon: A Whirligig Tour of the Beautiful Basics of Science is a book written by American science author Natalie Angier.

Overview

The Canon presents a summary of some of the different areas of science, as well as extensive descriptions of, and interviews with, contemporary scientists who work in these fields.  Angier's tenet is that an understanding of the basics of major areas of science can assist with providing a means by which to understand current scientific issues, and that this process should be fun.  In her Introduction, Angier writes:

Angier included quotes from the scientists she interviewed throughout her descriptions of different scientific topics in an attempt to show how scientists experience and think about their work, and why they do it.

Scientists interviewed
To obtain material for The Canon, Angier interviewed a number of scientists, professors, and other science professionals, and incorporated their stories and quotes into her work.  She asked them questions such as, "What does it mean to think scientifically?" and "What should nonspecialist nonchildren know about science, and how should they know it, and what is this thing called fun?"  Most of these scientists are presently active in their field of research.  In addition, many of these scientists have extensive bodies of work listed in detail elsewhere.  The below list links the science professionals who Angier interviewed for The Canon with additional details relating to their work:

Peter Atkins, a professor of chemistry at Oxford University
John Bahcall (now deceased), an astrophysicist at Princeton University
Neta Bahcall, an astrophysicist at Princeton University
David Baltimore, a Nobel laureate and former president of Caltech
Jacqueline Barton, a chemistry professor at the California Institute of Technology
Bonnie Bassler, a molecular biologist at Princeton University
David Bercovici, a professor of geophysics at Yale University
William Blair, a professor of astronomy at Johns Hopkins
Gunter Blobel, a Nobel laureate and cell biologist at Rockefeller University
David Botstein, a geneticist at Princeton University
Michael E. Brown, a planetary scientist at Caltech
Susan Carey, a professor of cognitive neuroscience at Harvard
Rick L. Danheiser, a chemistry professor at MIT
Frank DiSalvo, s professor of chemistry at Cornell University
Michael Duff, a theoretical physicist formerly at the University of Michigan
Tom Eisner, a professor of chemical ecology at Cornell
Andy Feinberg, a geneticist at Johns Hopkins University
Alvan Feinstein (now deceased), a professor of medicine and epidemiology at the Yale University School of Medicine
Alex Filippenko, an astronomer at the University of California, Berkeley
Gerald Fink, a biologist at MIT
Scott E. Fraser, a bioengineer at Caltech
 Bob Full, a materials scientist at the University of California, Berkeley
Peter Galison, a professor of history of physics at Harvard University
Brian Greene, theoretical physicist at Columbia University
Alan Guth, a physicist at MIT
Susan Hockfield, a neuroscientist and president of MIT
 Kip Hodges, director of the School of Earth and Space Exploration at Arizona State University
Roald Hoffmann, a chemist and poet-playwright at Cornell University
Robert Jaffe, a physicist at MIT
Lucy Jones, a seismologist at the California Institute of Technology
 Darcy Kelley, a neuroscientist at Columbia University
Mary B. Kennedy, a neurobiologist at Caltech
Andrew Knoll, a professor of natural history at Harvard's Earth and Planetary Sciences Department
Jonathan Koehler, a professor of economics at the University of Texas
Walter Lewin, a professor of physics at MIT
Susan Lindquist, a cell biologist and former director of the Whitehead Institute
Stephen Lippard, a professor of chemistry at MIT
Cindy Lustig, a professor of psychology at the University of Michigan
Tom Maniatis, a biologist at Harvard University
 Mario Mateo, a professor of astronomy at the University of Michigan
Robert Mathieu, a professor of astronomy at the University of Wisconsin
Stephen Mayo, a biology professor at Caltech
Elliot Meyerowitz, a biologist at Caltech
Kenneth R. Miller a biology professor at Brown University
James L. Mills, chief of the pediatric epidemiology section of the National Institute of Child Health and Human Development
Daniel Nocera, a chemist at MIT
 Deborah Nolan, a statistics professor at the University of California, Berkeley
Michael Novacek, a paleontologist and curator at the American Museum of Natural History
 John Allen Paulos, a mathematician at Temple University
 Sir Richard Peto, an epidemiologist at the University of Oxford
 Steven Pollock, a physics professor at the University of Colorado
Kent Redford, a biologist with the Wildlife Conservation Society
 Gene Robinson, a neuroethologist at the University of Illinois Urbana-Champaign
Michael Rubner, a materials scientist at MIT
 Donald Sadoway, a materials chemistry professor at MIT
 Maarten Schmidt, an astrophysicist
 John Henry Schwarz, a theoretical physicist at Caltech
 Ramamurti Shankar, a physics professor at Princeton University
 Neil Shubin, a paleontologist at the University of Chicago
 Cody Maverick, a oceanographer at the University of Hawaii
 Chuck Steidel, an astronomy professor at Caltech
 Paul Sternberg, a developmental biologist at Caltech
 David J. Stevenson, a planetary scientist at Caltech
 Scott Strobel, a biochemist at Yale University
 Raman Sundrum, a professor of physics and astronomy at Johns Hopkins
  David Wake, a biologist at the University of California's Museum of Vertebrate Zoology
 Bess Ward, a geosciences professor at Princeton University
 Steven Weinberg, a Nobel laureate and physics professor at the University of Texas
 Tim D. White, a paleoanthropologist at the University of California, Berkeley
 Michael Wigler, a biomedical researcher at the Cold Spring Harbor Laboratory
 Cynthia Wolberger, a biophysics professor at Johns Hopkins University

External links
Natalie Angier web site
Interview on Point of Inquiry podcast, June 29, 2007
New York Times Book Review by Steven Pinker, May 27, 2007
Presentation by Angier on The Canon, May 24, 2007, C-SPAN

2007 non-fiction books
Biology books
Science books
Popular science books
Mariner Books books